Take It to Heart is the third solo studio album by American singer-songwriter Michael McDonald. It was released on May 15, 1990, on the label Reprise, five years after his previous studio album, No Lookin' Back.

The album was slated to be titled “Lonely Talk” to be issued in August 1989. It also had a different track list, containing a song called “Plain of Jars” and a cover of Stevie Wonder’s “Higher Ground” (which ended up on his 1st Greatest Hits collection); there were also different versions of current tracks that made the official album. About 3 weeks prior to its original planned issue date, Reprise/WB decided there were not enough potential singles; therefore, “Tear It Up,” “All We Got” and “Get the Word Started” were added, with “Take It to Heart” recorded and added, which meant some songs and some versions were removed or changed (details unknown).

Track listing

Personnel 

 Michael McDonald – lead and backing vocals, synthesizer programming and sequencing (1, 4, 10), keyboards (2, 6-9, 11)
 Peter Leinheiser – synthesizer programming and sequencing (1), guitars (1)
 Michael Hanna – keyboards (2), synthesizer programming and sequencing (4)
 John Tesh – synthesizer programming and sequencing (4)
 Don Was – synthesizer programming and sequencing (4)
 Michael Mason – synthesizer programming and sequencing (4)
 Gardner Cole – synthesizer programming and sequencing (5)
 David Gamson – synthesizer programming and sequencing (5)
 Bernie Chiaravalle – guitars (2, 4, 7, 11), sitar (4)
 Michael Landau – guitars (3, 5-9, 11)
 Charles Frichtel – bass (2)
 Abraham Laboriel – bass (3, 6-9, 11), acoustic guitar (11)
 George Perilli – drums (2, 4)
 Jeff Porcaro – drums (3, 6-9, 11), percussion (6, 7, 10, 11), African log drum (11)
 Debra Dobkin – congas (2)
 Paulinho da Costa – percussion (4)
 Terry McMillan – percussion (6, 7), backing vocals (6)
 Vince Denham – saxophone and solo (2)
 Kirk Whalum – saxophone (3) 
 Stan Getz – saxophone (11)
 Paul Riser – string arrangements (2, 4)
 Brian McKnight – backing vocals (1)
 Chuck Sabatino – backing vocals (1, 6)
 Sweet Pea Atkinson – backing vocals (2, 4, 5)
 Harry Bowens – backing vocals (2, 4, 5)
 David Lasley – backing vocals (2, 4)
 Kathy Walker – backing vocals (2)
 Amy Holland – backing vocals (3)
 David Pack – backing vocals (5, 7)
 Maureen McDonald – backing vocals (7)

Production 
 Producers – Michael McDonald and Ted Templeman (tracks 1, 3 & 6-11); Don Was (tracks 2 & 4); David Gamson and Gardner Cole (track 5).
 Engineers – Ed Cherney, Jeff Hendricksen, Ross Pallone and Bob Schaper.
 Additional engineering – Ed Goodreau, Bob Schaper and Brian Schuble.
 Assistant engineers – Elaine Anderson, Michael Douglass, Lori Fumar, John Jackson, Rob Jaczko, Calvin Loser, Michael Mason, Eric Rudd, Scott Symington, Michael Tacci and Toby Wright.
 Remix on track 1 – Shep Pettibone
 Additional recording at Circle Seven Recording (Pacific Palisades, California); Ocean Way Recording (Hollywood, California); John Tesh Studios (Santa Monica, California).
 Mastered by George Marino at Sterling Sound (New York City, New York).
 Production coordinator – Joan Parker
 Photography – Andy Earl
 Art direction – Martyn Atkins, T&CP Associates, Hollywood, London.

Chart performance

See also
 List of albums released in 1990
 Michael McDonald's discography

References

External links

1990 albums
Michael McDonald (musician) albums
Albums arranged by Paul Riser
Albums produced by Ted Templeman
Albums produced by Don Was
Reprise Records albums
Albums recorded at Henson Recording Studios